The Mughrabi Quarter ( Hārat al-Maghāriba, Sh'khunat HaMughrabim) or Maghrebi Quarter was a neighbourhood in the southeast corner of the Old City of Jerusalem, established in the late 12th century. It bordered the western wall of the Temple Mount on the east, the Old City walls on the south (including the Dung Gate) and the Jewish Quarter to the west. It was an extension of the Muslim Quarter to the north, and was founded as an endowed Islamic waqf or religious property by a son of Saladin.

The quarter was razed by Israeli forces, at the behest of Teddy Kollek, the mayor of West Jerusalem, three days after the Six-Day War of 1967, in order to broaden the narrow alley leading to the Western Wall and prepare it for public access by Jews seeking to pray there. It is now the site of the Western Wall Plaza.

History

Ayyubid and Mamluk eras
According to the 15th-century historian Mujir ad-Dīn, soon after the Arabs had wrested back Jerusalem from the Crusaders the quarter was established in 1193 by Saladin's son al-Malik al-Afḍal Nurud-Dīn 'Ali, as a waqf (a mortmain consisting of a charitable trust) dedicated to all North African immigrants. The boundaries of this ḥārat or quarter, according to a later document, were the outer wall of the Haram al-Sharif to the east; south to the public thoroughfare leading to the Siloan spring; west as far as the residence of the qadi of Jerusalem, Shams al-Din; the northern limit ran to the Arcades of Umm al-Banat, otherwise known as the Qanṭarat Umam al-Banāt/Wilson's Arch causeway. It was set aside for "the benefit of all the community of the Maghreb of all description and different occupations, male and female, old and young, the low and the high, to settle on it in its residences and to benefit from its uses according to their different needs." Soon after, Jews, many also from North Africa, were also allowed to settle in the city. By 1303, Maghrebi people were well established there, a fact attested by the endowment of a Zāwiyah, or religious institution such as a monastery, made by 'Umar Ibn Abdullah Ibn 'Abdun-Nabi al-Maṣmūdi al-Mujarrad for this quarter.

Al-Afḍal's waqf was not only religious and charitable in its aims, but also provided for the establishment of a madrassa law school there, thereafter called eponymously the Afḍaliyyah, for the benefit of the Malikite Islamic jurists (fuqaha) in the city. A distinguished scion of an Andalusian Sufi family of mystics, Abū Madyan, settled in Jerusalem in the early 14th century, and made another major endowment, of a Zāwiyah near the Bāb al-Silsilah, or Chain Gate, of the Harat, for the Maghrebis in 1320. This consisted in a waqf property at 'Ain Kārim and another at Qanṭarat Umam al-Banāt at the Gate of the Chain, -the latter as a hospice exclusively for newly arrived immigrants- the usufruct (manfa'ah) of both to be set aside in perpetuity for the Maghrebis in Jerusalem. The Qanṭarat Umam al-Banāt endowment consisted of a hall, two apartments, a yard, private conveniences, and, below, a store and a cave (qabw). Attached to the document was a stipulation that the properties be placed, after the donor's death, under the care of an administrator (mutawalli) and supervisor (nāzir) selected on the basis of the community's recognition of his outstanding qualities of piety and wisdom. The Ain Karim properties alone were extensive, 15,000 dunams, and covered most of the village.

Some time in the early 1350s, a third waqf was instituted by the Marinid Dynasty's King 'Ali Ibn 'Uthmān Ibn Ya'qūb Ibn 'Abdul-Ḥaqq al-Marini. This consisted of a codex of the Qur'an copied by his own hand Further endowments to the quarter took place in 1595 and 1630.

Until the advent of Muslims in Jerusalem, most of the area below the Western Wall was crammed with rubble, and Jewish prayer throughout the Islamic period appears to have been performed inside synagogues in the Jewish Quarter, or, on public occasions, on the Mount of Olives. The narrow space dividing the Western Wall from the houses of the Mughrabi Quarter was created at the behest of Suleiman the Magnificent in the sixteenth century in order to allow prayers to be said there.

Ottoman era

The Ottoman taxation registers listed 13 households in the quarter in 1525–26, 69 households, 1 bachelor and 1 imam in 1538–39, 84 households and 11 bachelors in 1553–34, 130 households and 2 bachelors in 1562–63, and 126 households and 7 bachelors in 1596–97. Originally developed for Maghrebi people, over the centuries Jewish, Christian and Muslim people from Palestine and elsewhere had at various times taken up residence there. By the time Israel decided to demolish their houses, roughly half of the zone's inhabitants could trace their origins back to Maghreb immigrants.

According to the French traveller Chateaubriand who visited in 1806, some of the residents of the quarter were descended from Moors who had been expelled from Spain in the late 15th century. They had been well received by the local community and a mosque had been built for them. Residents of the neighborhood held on to their culture in the way of food, clothing and traditions until it became assimilated with the rest of the Old City in the 19th century. Thus it also became a natural place of stay to Maghrebi people who came on pilgrimage to the al-Aqsa Mosque.

Over the years a small number of schools and mosques were established in the quarter and Muslim clerics who performed religious duties at the al-Aqsa Mosque lived there.

The site of Jewish prayer and lamentation was a stretch of some 30 metres along the wall, accessed via a narrow passage from King David's Street. In depth from the wall the paved area extended 11 feet. At the southern end lay one of the two zāwiyyah dedicated there in medieval times and the lane to the Wailing Wall sector ended in a blind alley closed off by the houses of the Maghrebi people beneficiaries. In 1840 a proposal by a British Jew, the first attempt to change the status quo, was conveyed via the British consul, and requested that Jews be allowed to repave the 120 sq. metre area. The plan was rejected both by the Abu Madyan waqf administrator and by Muhammad Ali Pasha. Moslems in the area also complained of the excessive noise, as opposed to past practice, caused by recent Jewish pilgrims. Jews at prayer were asked to continue their traditional practices quietly, and to refrain from proclaiming on doctrinal matters there.

By the beginning of the 19th century Jewish worshippers were rare, and according to Yehoshua Ben Arieh, lacked any special distinction. In an account of his travels to the Holy Land in 1845, T. Tobler noted the existence of a mosque in the Mughrabi quarter.

According to Yeohoshua Ben-Arieh, the Maghrebi people regarded the Jews as infidels. They were subjected to harassment and were required to pay a sum in exchange for the right to pray there undisturbed. Increased friction at the site between Jews and Muslims arose with the onset of Zionism and the resulting fear among the Muslims that the Jews would claim the entire Temple Mount. Attempts were made at various times, by Moses Montefiore and Baron Rothschild to buy the whole area, without success. In 1887 Rothschild's bid to purchase the Quarter came with a project to rebuild it as "a merit and honor to the Jewish People" relocating the inhabitants in better accommodation elsewhere. The Ottoman authorities appeared to be ready to give their approval. According to some sources, the highest secular and Muslim religious authorities in Jerusalem, such as the Mutasarrıf or Ottoman Governor of Jerusalem, Şerif Mehmed Rauf Paşa, and the Mufti of Jerusalem, Mohammed Tahir Husseini, actually gave their approval. The plan foundered on Jewish, rather than Muslim objections was shelved after the chief rabbinical Haham of the Jerusalemite Sephardi community stated that he had had a "providential intimation" that, were the sale to go through, a terrible massacre of Jews would ensue. His opinion might have reflected a Sephardi fear that the Ashkenazis would thereby take possession of the holiest site in Judaism.

In the first two months after the Ottoman Empire's entry into the First World War, the Turkish governor of Jerusalem, Zakey Bey, offered to sell the quarter to Jews, requesting a sum of £20,000 which, he said, would be used to both rehouse the Muslim families and to create a public garden in front of the Wall. However, the Jews of the city lacked the necessary funds.

British Mandate era

A hospice, the Dar al-Magharibah, existed in the quarter to extend lodgings for Mughrabi Muslims on pilgrimage to the Islamic sites of Jerusalem.

In April 1918, Chaim Weizmann, then a prominent Zionist leader on a visit to Jerusalem, sent a letter via Ronald Storrs offering the sheikhs £70,000 in exchange for the Wall and the buildings of the Mughrabi quarter. This was immediately rejected when the Muslim authorities got wind of the proposal. Nothing daunted, Weizmann then addressed his petition to Arthur Balfour, asking him to resolve the issue by ruling in favour of the Jews. In a letter of 30 May that year, headed THE HANDING OVER OF THE WAILING WALL TO THE JEWS, he gave his reasons as follows:
We Jews have many holy places in Palestine, but the Wailing Wall-believed to be part of the old Temple Wall-is the only one which is in some sense left to us. All the others are in the hands of Christians or Moslems. And even the Wailing Wall is not really ours. It is surrounded by a group of miserable, dirty cottages and derelict buildings, which make the whole place from the hygienic point of view a positive danger, and from the sentimental point of view a source of constant humiliation to the Jews of the world. Our most sacred monument, in our most sacred city, is in the hands of some doubtful Moghreb religious community, which keeps these cottages as a source of income. We are willing to compensate this community very liberally, but we should like the place to be cleaned up; we should like to give it a dignified and respectable appearance.'

The wall as well as the Mughrabi Quarter nonetheless, throughout the British Mandatory period, remained Waqf property, while Jews retained their longstanding right to visit it.   During the 1929 Palestine riots Jews and Muslims did however clash over competing claims on the area adjacent to the Mughrabi Quarter, with Jews denying they had no aims regarding the Haram al-Sharif but demanding the British authorities expropriate and raze the Mughrabi quarter. Jewish Maghrebi people and Muslim Maghrebi people pilgrims, both groups on a visit to Jerusalem, were present at the riots, and several of the former were killed or injured.   Great Britain appointed a commission under the approval of the League of Nations to settle the issue. The Commission again reaffirmed the status quo, while placing certain restrictions on activities, including forbidding Jews from conducting the Yom Kippur prayers (the holiest holiday in Judaism), which involved the blowing of the Shofar, and Muslims from carrying out the Dhikr (Islamic prayers) close to the wall or to cause annoyance to the Jews.

Jordanian era
When Jordanian forces emerged as the victors in the battle for possession of the Old City in the 1948 Arab–Israeli War, 1,500 Jewish residents, coinciding with the flight or expulsion of 70,000 Palestinians from Israeli-occupied areas of Jerusalem, were expelled from the Jewish Quarter, which was in the vicinity of the Mughrabi zone.

Disputes were not infrequent between the quarter's inhabitants and Palestinian landlords, squabbling over property rights. In 1965, Palestinian squatters in Jewish properties on the edge of the Mughrabi Quarter were evicted by the Jordanian government and resettled in the Shu'afat refugee camp, four kilometers north of the Old City. The motives behind this ejection are unknown.

According to French historian Vincent Lemire, during the period of Jordanian control the French Fourth and Fifth Republics claimed extraterritorial jurisdiction over the Waqf Abu Madyan, an Algerian waqf located in the Mughrabi Quarter. France had claimed jurisdiction over the waqf on 6 July 1949. In the aftermath of the Arab–Israeli War, Israel annexed the village of Ein Karem. The Waqf Abu Madyan depended on the village's agricultural output for income and was thus left in a precarious financial situation, precipitating France's sovereignty claim.

The French Ministry of Foreign Affairs used its position in Jerusalem to curry favor with Israel, Algeria, Tunisia, and Morocco by providing financial support to the waqf and, therefore, North African Muslim pilgrims. For example, in 1954 French intellectual Louis Massignon organized a charitable collection at the gates of the Great Mosque of Tlemcen in Algeria in support of the waqf in an effort to improve Franco-Algerian relations. On 12 February 1962—four days after the Charonne Métro station massacre and about one month prior to the signing of the Évian Accords, a ceasefire agreement between France and Algeria—France abandoned its claim to the waqf.

Demolition

Preparations
The razing of the quarter took place without any official authorization. Responsibility for demolishing the Mughrabi Quarter is contested between several figures: Teddy Kollek, Moshe Dayan, Colonel Shlomo Lahat, Uzi Narkiss and David Ben-Gurion. The precise details of how the operation was carried out are not clear, since no paper trail was left by the participants.  According to one source, the retired Israeli Prime Minister David Ben-Gurion played a pivotal role in the decision to demolish the quarter. He visited the Wall on 8 June, with Teddy Kollek, Shimon Peres and Ya'akov Yannai, head of the National Parks Authority at the time Ben-Gurion was upset at sighting a sign in Arabic on 9 June, the day after the Old City had been captured and protested at the presence of a sign in Arabic.
He noticed a tile sign in front of the Wall, which read "Al-Burak Road" in English and Arabic but not in Hebrew. It was a reminder of the prophet Mohammad's legendary horse, Buraq, left tethered by the Wall as the prophet took his journey to heaven from the famous rock above. Ben-Gurion looked at the sign with disapproval and asked if anyone had a hammer. A soldier tried to pry off the tile with a bayonet, but Ben-Gurion was concerned about damage to the stone. An axe was produced and the name on the tile carefully removed. The symbolism of expunging Arabic from the redeemed Jewish holy site was not lost on the surrounding crowd, or on Ben-Gurion. They cheered, and Ben-Gurion exclaimed, "This is the greatest moment of my life since I came to Israel."

Ben-Gurion also proposed the following day that the walls of the Old City be demolished since they weren't Jewish, but the government did not take up the idea. Teddy Kollek in his memoirs wrote that it was necessary to knock down the quarter because a pilgrimage to the wall was being organized with hundreds of thousands of Jews, and their passage through the "dangerous narrow alleys" of the "slum hovels"  was unthinkable: they needed a clear bright space to celebrate their return to the site after 19 years. To that end, archaeologists and planners had examined the area the day before to map out what had to be demolished. The operations had a larger scope, not only to clear the Mughrabi quarter, but also expel all the Palestinian inhabitants of the contiguous, predominantly Arab-owned Jewish Quarter, who, he claimed, had 'no special feeling for the place and would be satisfied to receive ample compensation for their expulsion. The Jerusalem Post described the area as a jumble of hovels on the same day bulldozing operations began, and a writer later commented on this designation as follows:
The day the bulldozing began the quarter was described in The Jerusalem Post as a slum. Two days later it was reported as having been by and large abandoned during the siege. I expect in time that its existence will vanish altogether from the pages of developing Zionist history.

Shlomo Lahat, who had just flown back from a fund-raising campaign in South America, recalled that on his arrival at 4 am 7 June, Moshe Dayan informed him of the imminent conquest of Jerusalem, and that he wanted Lahat, a stickler for discipline, as military governor of the city. He needed someone "prepared to shoot Jews if need be". Once the city was taken, at a meeting involving himself, Dayan, Kollek and Uzi Narkiss, Lahat suggested that the programmed visit of Jews on Shavuot meant that there would be a crush of people crowding in, risking a higher casualty rate than that sustained by the war, and suggested the area be cleared, an idea that met Dayah's approval. This is disputed by Ya'akov Salman who stated that it was he who raised the problem of the courtyard's limitations.

Demolition
There were 135 houses in the quarter, and the destruction left at least 650 people refugees. According to one surviving eyewitness, after its capture by Israel, the entire Old City was placed under a strict curfew. On Saturday evening 10 June, the last day of the Six-Day War, coinciding with the end of the Jewish Sabbath, a number of searchlights were positioned and floodlit up the quarter's warrens. Twenty-odd Jerusalem building contractors, hired by Kollek, first knocked down a public lavatory with sledgehammers. Army bulldozers were then brought in to raze the houses.

The residents were given either a few minutes, fifteen minutes or three hours to evacuate their homes. They initially refused to budge.  In the face of this reluctance, lieutenant Colonel Ya'akov Salman, the deputy military governor, issued an order to an Engineering Corps officer to start bulldozing, and, on striking one particular structure, caused the whole building to collapse on its residents. It was this act which caused the remaining residents to flee their apartments and enter vehicles that were stationed outside to bus them away. Amidst the rubble, a middle-aged, or elderly woman, al-Hajjah Rasmiyyah 'Ali Taba'ki, was discovered in her death throes.  One of the engineers, Yohanan Montsker, had her rushed to hospital but by midnight she was dead. According to an interview given two decades later by
Eitan Ben-Moshe, the engineer attached to the IDF Central Command who oversaw the operation, she was not the only victim. He recalled recovering 3 bodies that were transported to the Bikur Cholim Hospital, and while some other bodies were buried with the disposed rubble:
I had thrown out all the garbage. We threw out the wreckage of houses together with the Arab corpses. We threw Arab corpses and not Jewish, so that they would not convert the area to a place where it is forbidden to tread.
The following morning, Colonel Lahat described the demolition workers as mostly being drunk "on wine and joy".

Permission to salvage their personal belongings was denied. The reason given by an Israeli soldier was that they were pressed for time, since only two days remained before the feast of the "Passover" (actually Shavuot), and many Jews were expected to arrive on the following Tuesday at the Western Wall. The haste of demolition was necessary, it was argued, to prepare a yard for the festive worshippers. The prime minister at the time, Levi Eshkol was completely unaware of the operation, and phoned Narkiss on the 11th asking the reason why the houses were being demolished. Narkiss, pretending not to know, replied that he'd look into the matter.

Historic buildings razed
In addition to 135 houses, the demolition destroyed the Bou Medyan zaouia, the Sheikh Eid Mosque, – one of the few mosques remaining from the time of Saladin, whose historic significance was identified by the Israel Antiquities Authority. In destroying the small mosque near the Buraq section of the Wall, associated with the ascent of Mohammad on his steed Buraq to heaven, the engineer Ben Moshe is quoted as having exclaimed: "Why shouldn't the mosque be sent to Heaven, just as the magic horse did?"

Two years later, another complex of buildings close to the wall, that included Madrasa Fakhriya (Fakhriyyah zawiyya) and the house in front of the Bab al-Magharibah that the Abu al-Sa'ud family had occupied since the 16th century but which had been spared in the 1967 destruction, were demolished in June 1969. The Abu al-Sa'ud building was a well-known example of Mamluk architecture, and there were several reasons given for its demolition. Its removal enabled Israeli archaeologists to excavate in the area; to provide open ground to enable the IDF to access the area rapidly should troubles arise at the Wall, and finally, while the antiquity of the housing complex was admitted, the fact too that extensive repairs to the roof and balconies had been made using railway track beams and concrete was adduced to assert that they had sufficient modern traces to be accidental to the area's history. Yasser Arafat's mother was of al-Sa'ud stock, and it appears that Arafat had lived in the house during his childhood, in the years 1933 to 1936.

On 12 June, at a Ministerial Meeting on the Status of Jerusalem, when the issue of demolitions in the Old City was broached, the Justice Minister Ya'akov Shapira judged that: "They are illegal demolitions but it's good that they are being done." Lieutenant Colonel Yaakov Salman, the deputy military governor in charge of the operation, aware of possible legal trouble on account of the Fourth Geneva Convention forearmed himself with documents from the East Jerusalem municipality testifying to the poor sanitary conditions in the neighborhood and Jordanian plans to eventually evacuate it. By the 14th, some 200,000 Israelis had come to visit the site.

Aftermath
On 18 April 1968, the Israeli government expropriated the land for public use and paid from 100 to 200 Jordanian dinars to each family that had been displaced. 41 heads of families who had been evicted from the area wrote to Kollek to thank him for his assistance in resettling them in better housing conditions. The rest of the families have refused compensation on the grounds that it would lend legitimacy to what Israel did to them.

In the post-1967 period, many of the evicted refugees managed to emigrate to Morocco via Amman due to the intervention of King Hassan II. Other refugee families resettled in the Shu'afat refugee camp and other parts of Jerusalem. The prayer site was extended southwards to double its length from 28 to 60 meters, and the original plaza of four meters to 40 meters: the small 120 square meter area in front of the wall became the Western Wall Plaza, now in use as an open-air synagogue covering 20,000 square meters.

In a letter to the United Nations, the Israeli government stated nine months later that the buildings were demolished after the Jordanian government had allowed the neighborhood to become a slum area.

The expelled community continues to elect an administrator or mukhtar for the no-longer existing Mughrabi Quarter.

Archeological excavations in early January 2023 revealed walls nearly a metre high, traces of paint, a cobbled courtyard and a system to drain rainwater.

Interpretations
According to Gershom Gorenberg,
The action fit the pre-state strategy of the Zionist left, which believed in speaking softly and "creating facts"; using faits accomplis to determine the political future of disputed land.'

Notes

Citations

Sources

1190s establishments in the Ayyubid Sultanate
1967 disestablishments
Former neighborhoods
Historic sites in Jerusalem
Moroccan diaspora
Neighbourhoods of Jerusalem
Old City (Jerusalem)
Quarters (urban subdivision)